The Gilette National Youth League was a British rugby league tournament at under-18 level. It was previously known as the Halifax Home Insurance National Youth League.

It is the second-tier competition at under-18s. The top level is the Gilette Academy Championship, which in 2009 consists of the under-18 team of the twelve English based Super League teams and also of Championship clubs Widnes Vikings and Sheffield Eagles.

It was administered by the British Amateur Rugby League Association. In 2011 it switched to summer as the Conference Youth League. After the 2012 season the league was abolished and teams returned to local leagues.

2012 participants

West division

Folly Lane
Leigh East
North Wales Crusaders
Rylands Sharks
Saddleworth Rangers
Wigan St Jude's
NB: Pilkington Recs, Thatto Heath Crusaders and Leigh Miners Rangers failed to complete the season

East division

 Dewsbury Celtic
Newcastle Thunder
Hemel Stags
Holderness Vikings
Hunslet Warriors
Milford Marlins
West Hull
NB: Keighley Cougars Cubs and East Leeds failed to complete the season

Participants in previous seasons

2005–06: Blackbrook, Bradford Dudley Hill, Castleford Lock Lane, Drighlington, Embassy Longhill, Hensingham, Ince Rose Bridge, Kells, Leigh East, Leigh Miners Rangers, Siddal, Waterhead, West Hull, Wibsey Juniors, Widnes St Mary's, Wigan St Jude's
2006–07: Bradford Dudley Hill, Castleford Lock Lane, Featherstone Lions, Hensingham, Ince Rose Bridge, Keighley Cougar Cubs, Kells, Leigh East, Leigh Miners Rangers, Siddal, Waterhead, West Bowling, West Hull, Wibsey Juniors, Widnes St Mary's, Wigan St Patrick's (Bradford Dudley Hill and West Bowling failed to complete the season)
2007–08: East Leeds, Elland, Featherstone Lions, Gateshead Thunder, Hensingham, Ince Rose Bridge, Keighley Cougar Cubs, Kells, Leigh East, Leigh Miners Rangers, Rylands, Saddleworth Rangers, Siddal, Waterhead, West Hull, Wibsey Juniors (Hensingham failed to complete the season)
2008-9: Celtic Crusaders Colts, East Leeds, Featherstone Lions, Gateshead Thunder, Ince Rose Bridge, Keighley Cougar Cubs, Leigh East, Leigh Miners Rangers, North London Stags, Saddleworth Rangers, Siddal, Waterhead, West Cumbria, West Hull (Waterhead failed to complete the season)
2009–10: Barrow Laikers, Castleford Lock Lane, Celtic Crusaders Colts, East Leeds, Featherstone Lions, Gateshead Thunder, Halifax Siddal, Hemel Stags, Ince Rose Bridge, Keighley Cougar Cubs, Leigh East, Saddleworth Rangers, Sheffield Hillsborough Hawks, Stanningley, West Cumbria, West Hull, Widnes St Maries, Widnes West Bank Bears
2010: Short season due to change over to summer season: Bradford Dudley Hill, Castleford Lock Lane, Dewsbury Celtic, Featherstone Lions, Gateshead Thunder, Hemal Stags, Holderness Vickings, Ince Rose Bridge, Keighley Cougar Cubs, Leeds Stanningley, Leigh East, Leigh Miners Rangers, Milford Marlins, Saddleworth Rangers, Sheffield Hillsborough Hawks, Thatto Heath Crusaders, West Cumbria, Widnes West Bank Bears.
2011: East: Bradford Dudley Hill, Castleford Lock Lane, Dewsbury Celtic, East Leeds, Gateshead Thunder, Hemel Stags, Holderness Vikings, Hunslet Warriors, Keighley Cougar Cubs, Leeds Milford Marlins, Saddleworth Rangers – Featherstone Lions failed to complete the season
2011: West: Halton Farnworth Hornets, Ince Rose Bridge, Leigh East, Leigh Miners Rangers, North Wales Crusaders, Thatto Heath Crusaders, Warrington Crosfields, Warrington Rylands Sharks, Widnes West Bank, Wigan St Judes, – CPC Bears and West Cumbria failed to complete the season

Winners

See also

 Junior rugby league in England

External links
 
 BARLA Official Website
 Lancashire Service Area

BARLA competitions
Junior rugby league
Children's sport in the United Kingdom